MV Murell was a  coaster that was built in 1940 as Fiddown by Goole Shipbuilding & Repairing Co Ltd, Goole, Yorkshire, United Kingdom for S Morris Ltd. In 1941, she was run down and sunk by  in the Mersey Estuary. She was salvaged in 1942, repaired and passed to the Ministry of War Transport (MoWT), renamed Empire Estuary. She was sold into merchant service in 1946 and renamed Goldfawn. A further sale in 1952 saw her renamed Creekdawn. A sale to an Irish company in 1954 saw her renamed Murell. She served until 1972, when she was scrapped.

Description
The ship was built in 1940 by Goole Shipbuilding & Repairing Co Ltd, Goole, Yorkshire. She was yard number 350.

The ship was propelled by a 115 nhp two-stroke Single Cycle, Single Action diesel engine, which had six cylinders of  diameter by  stroke driving a single screw propeller. The engine was built by Crossley Brother Ltd, Manchester, Lancashire.

History

World War II
Fiddown was built for S Morris Ltd, Goole. She was launched on 9 May 1940 and completed in July. She was built for S Morris Ltd, Dublin, Ireland. Due to wartime export restrictions, she was placed under the British Flag, with Goole as her port of registry. The United Kingdom Official Number 164907 and Code Letters MJJY were allocated. Little is known of her service, although she was a member of Convoy FN 222, which departed from Southend, Essex on 14 July 1940 and arrived at Methil, Fife two days later. She was raised and beached at Tranmere, Cheshire on 7 July 1942. On 10 July, she was refloated and taken to a shipyard for repairs.

Fiddown was requisitioned by the MoWT. She was renamed Empire Estuary and re-entered service in 1943. She was placed under the management of Craggs & Jenkin Ltd, remaining registered at Goole and retaining the Code Letters MJJY. On 2 June 1944, Empire Estuary joined Convoy EBC 1, which departed from Barry, Glamorgan and sailed to the St Helens Roads, off the Isle of Wight. She then sailed to the Solent to join Convoy EBC 3W, which departed on 8 June and arrived at the Seine Bay, France the next day. She was to spend the next three months sailing between the Seine Bay and Southend, with a couple of visits to Southampton, Hampshire in August. In September, Empire Estuary was operating in convoys between Newhaven, East Sussex and Dieppe, France.

Post-war
In 1946, Empire Estuary was sold to E J & W Goldsmith Ltd, London and renamed Goldfawn. In 1952, Goldfawn was sold to Springwell Shipping Co Ltd, London and renamed Creekdawn. In 1952, Creekdawn was sold to James Tyrrell, Arklow, and renamed Murell (derived from his wife's name, Kathleen Muriel Tyrrell (née Hicks)).  In 1966,  Arklow Shipping Ltd was formed in Arklow. Murell was one of the original seven ships owned by the company. She served until February 1972, when she was scrapped in Dublin.

References

Further reading

1940 ships
Ships built in Goole
Maritime incidents in November 1941
Maritime incidents in July 1942
World War II merchant ships of the United Kingdom
Empire ships
Ministry of War Transport ships
Merchant ships of the United Kingdom
Merchant ships of the Republic of Ireland